Dove Creek is a stream in the U.S. state of Colorado.

Dove Creek was named for the abundance of doves native to the area.

See also
List of rivers of Colorado

References

Rivers of Dolores County, Colorado
Rivers of Colorado